Anton Mari Hao Lim, DVM, better known as Doc Anton Lim, is a Filipino veterinarian, businessman, public figure, and humanitarian. He is also a frequent speaker, organizer, and community volunteer throughout the Philippines and advocates for the disadvantaged. He is the Coordinator of Tzu Chi Foundation, Zamboanga Liaison Office, where he began volunteering in 1998. He co-founded the Yellow Boat of Hope Foundation in 2010, which speaks to the needs of communities where students are often forced to swim to and from school. To provide support, he networks with local, national, and international nonprofits, private organizations, and committed volunteers. 

An active member of the Rotary Club of Zamboanga City, Dr. Lim was an early winner of the TESDA-IX Kabalikat Awards in Western Mindanao. He also sits on the Board of Tzu Chi Foundation, Philippine Branch Office, and is a director of Rotary Club of Zamboanga City, where he was also a past president. He has received numerous Rotary International awards and citations including the Rotary International Service Above Self Award— the highest award Rotary International can bestow to its members worldwide. He is considered the Chief Dreamer and Implementer for the Zamboanga Funds for Little Kids, which was the initial humanitarian movement of what is now the Yellow Boat of Hope Foundation. In July 2016, Dr. Lim was named one of Forbes Asia’s 2016 Heroes of Philanthropy. Later in 2016, Dr. Lim was named CEO of The BEAGIVER Dreams Project, the giving arm of BEAGIVER.com.ph. He earned a Master in Business Administration, Ateneo de Zamboanga University, March 2018. In 2019, Dr. Lim was invited to be a participant in U.S. Department of State's professional exchange program, the International Visitor Leadership Program (IVLP) project "Volunteerism and Civic Action," April 22 - May 10, 2019. He was the sole representative from his country.

Early life and education
Anton Lim grew up in Zamboanga City witnessing his parents, Antonio and Maria Yu Lim Bo helping other people without fanfare at crucial times in their lives. A graduate of Zamboanga Chong Hua High School, he went on to attend University of the Philippines at Los Baños, graduating with a DVM in 1988. He went on to place among the Top 10 in the government licensure examination for Veterinarians.

Early career
Born November 22, 1965, in Zamboanga City Mindanao, Philippines, Lim began his career as a veterinarian, and later, after meeting the founder of Tzu Chi, Dharma Master Cheng Yen he was soon challenged to establish a liaison office in Zamboanga City, and eventually agreed. He has always been involved in community service, much of which is through the Rotary Club of Zamboanga City.

Awards
INTERNATIONAL
 Committee on Rules of I MINA’TRENTAI SINGKO NA LINESLATURAN GUAHAN: Certificate of Recognition commending participation in the International Visitor Leadership Project and for establishing a close relationship with Guam. August 2019

 Forbes Asia Heroes of Philanthropy, Forbes Magazine, 2016

 Rotary International Service Above Self Award, Rotary International USA, 2007

 The Rotary Foundation District Service Award Rotary Year 2004-2005, The Rotary Foundation of Rotary International

 The Rotary Foundation District Service Award Rotary Year 1998-1999, The Rotary Foundation of Rotary International

 Most Decorated Honorary Citizen of the City of Davis, California, USA, Honor conferred by Mayor Joseph F. Krovoza June 5, 2013 at Davis, CA

 Country Representative - U.S. Dept of State International Volunteers Leadership Program/ Civic Action Volunteerism, April-May 2019

NATIONAL
 Zamboanga Chong Hua High School Alumni Association of Metro Manila: Centennial Outstanding Alumnus Award November 2019

 WE Award for Purposeful Entrepreneurship, Day 8 Business Academy, 2019

 12th Epic Awards, Philippine Academy of Specialist Incorporated, 2017

 Pillar of Hope, ETON International School, 2017

 Finalist Gawad Geny Lopez Jr. Bayaning Filipino, ABS-CBN Foundation, 2014

 Distinguished Alumnus for Veterinary Practice, UP College of Veterinary Medicine Alumni Association, 2013

 Jollibee Family Values Award. Jollibee Foundation, 2013

 Cobra Pinoy Hero-Modern Day Hero Awardee, Cobra Energy Drink, 2013

 Kabalikat Awards, TESDA, 1999

 Top 10 Placer, National Veterinary Medicine Professional Licensure Exam, 1989

 National Bato-Balani Youth Awardee, Bato-Balani Foundation, 1987

REGIONAL
 Winner, Gawad Geny Lopez Jr. Bayaning Filipino Region IX, ABS-CBN Foundation, 2014

 Zamboanga Hermosa Awards for Community Service, City Government of Zamboanga City, 2011

 Certificate of Appreciation, Joint Special Task Force Philippines, 2012

 Plaque of Recognition Community Service, City Government of Zamboanga, 2011

 Outstanding Rotary Club President, 1998, Rotary District 3850

In 2012 Dr. Lim took over the mentoring and transportation of Kabang and in 2013 following Kabang's cancer surgery and later snout surgery, he received this award:  "In honor of your visit and in appreciation for your help to Wonder Dog Kabang, you are hereby designated a Most Decorated Honorary Citizen of the City of Davis, California." The certificate was signed June 5, 2013 by Joseph F. Krovoza, Mayor.

The Committee on Rules of MINA'TRENTAI SINGKO NA LIHESLATURAN GUAHAN recognizes and commends Dr. Anton Lim on behalf of the people of Guam for his participation in the International Visitor Leadership Project and for establishing a close relationship with Guam. August 6 2019.

EDSA People Power Commission
A strong advocate for good governance and linking government with the people and civil society organizations, he sits as National Execom member of the People Power Volunteers for Reform and was recently appointed by Benigno Aquino, President of the Philippines as one of the 5 commissioners of the EDSA People Power Commission whose main task is to perpetuate the spirit of the EDSA People Power Revolution by developing an army of volunteers for nation building.

Yellow Boat of Hope Foundation (2010-present)
The Yellow Boat Project was Jaboneta and Lim’s first try to restore hope and empower entire communities. In less than two years the Yellow Boat project had grown into a national movement in many underprivileged communities. These are called Yellow Boat Communities, but they are often about more than boats: it is the Yellow Boat principle of helping others so they may learn, grow, and flourish on their own. There is now a registered foundation named Yellow Boat of Hope Foundation, Inc. In 2015, the Yellow Boat of Hope USA, a 501 (c)(3), was formed, with Dr. Lim named as Co-founder/President. 

A strong believer in empowerment, education, community cohesion, and sustainability, Dr. Lim, Jay Jaboneta, Ofelia M. Samar-Sy and their fellow Yellow Boat associates offers transportation, medical help, economic involvement, and educational support. Among the projects: Dormitories adjacent to schools for those children with long distances to travel; school room additions; schools; and Yellow Boats designed to support ALS needs throughout the islands, in conjunction with the Department of Education. The goal is that by giving these communities the necessary tools to succeed, these communities will, in time, no longer need the Yellow Boat Foundation.

Kabang
In mid-2012, Dr. Lim became the caregiver of Filipino hero dog, Kabang, and in early October, accompanied her to the United States: University of California, Davis. On October 17, the university announced that doctors would not be able to close Kabang’s wound until she received treatment for a vaginal tumor and heartworm. They estimate it could be several months before Kabang will be ready to undergo dental surgery and facial reconstruction. Update: June 2013. The surgery is complete and Dr. Lim and Team Kabang accompanied her to the Philippines. She has had a great deal of publicity, and she has returned to her normal life with Dr. Anton Lim as an ongoing mentor. There are, however, various visits by the media, and she is held up as a special example for other similarly maimed dogs seeking surgery.

References

1965 births
Living people
People from Zamboanga City